The Brittial Bania/Bania is an ethnic community in Assam, India. The group traces its roots to a merchant community who reached Assam (Ancient Kamarupa) in ancient times. Some historians claim that after the Austric group migrated to ancient Assam, the next group of people who arrived was the Dravidian group, who are represented by the Bania and Kaibbartas today. Unlike the mainland Baniya community, this community of Assam is recognized as Schedule Caste by the government of India.

Origin
Chand Sadagar, who was a Merchant ("Bania" in Assamese) is believed to be the ancient ancestor of the ethnic Bania community of Assam. He was a rich and powerful river and sea merchant of Champak Nagar, Kamarupa who lived between 200 and 300 AD. Narayan Dev gave an account in his Manasamangal about the merchant ship of the trader Chand Saudagar proceeding to the sea from ancient Champaknagar of Assam passing through Saptagram and Tribeni, the tri-junction of the Ganges, Saraswati and Jamuna River.

In the Padmapurana (Hindu Scriptures), account of Chand Bania (Sadagar) is specifically mentioned. Narayan Dev also have mentioned in Padma purana about the father of Behula who was called as Sahe Bania. Sahe Bania established his kingdom at Udalguri/Tangla area of the old Kamarupa.Further, it has been established in the history book "Mangaldai Buranji" by the historian Dineswar Sarma that Chand Sadagar belonged to ancient Bania community whose predecessors are represented by the Assamese Bania community today. These people later got scattered all over Brahmaputra valley. However, people with direct lineage of Chand Sadagar are still there in Udalguri district and Tangla district of Assam.

The ruins and statue of Chand Sadagar are found in Chhaygaon Area of Assam. It is proved genuine by the Archaeological Department of India. Moreover, Champak Nagar is still found in Chaigaon of Kamarupa.

Medieval history 

During the Medieval Period, most of the people from the Bania community accepted Vaishnavism under the patronage of Srimanta Sankardeva. Hari Das Baniya, a prominent Vaishnav Saint during the 14th century, was a devotee and a very close disciple of Srimanta Sankardeva. Hari Das Bania Ata later took patronage at the Barpeta Satra although he originally belonged to Nagaon. He played a significant role in the Vaishnav movement led by Srimanta Samkardeva. The famous historian of the Ahom King, Purandar Singha, Swarnakar Dutiram Hazarika was from this community. One of his well known history books is Kali Bharat Buranji. It is the one and only history book written in the form of poetry in Assam.

He wrote several other important books in the 18th century such as Rasik Puran (about the evil effect of opium in Assamese society) and Baniya Xokol Axomoloi Oha Vrittanto (an account of the Advent of Baniyas to Assam). The Baniyas of Assam were offered good ranks in the Ahom Administration/Army: Pani Phukan, Hazarika, Boruah, Borah, Mudoi etc.
The Bania people like the Kaibarta were considered lower class by the Kayastha and Brahmin community of Assam during the medieval period. This system is still prevalent in some parts of Assam. Like, the Kaibbarta community, the Baniya community of upper Assam also joined the Moamoria Rebellion (1769–1805) as they were followers of Aniruddhadev. They took patronage under the satras that followed the Kala Sanghati (Mayamara cult which allowed people from all castes and tribes equal status and opportunities in preaching and practicing the Vaishnav Dharma) like the Dihing Satra, Mayamara Satra etc.

Post-Colonisation era 

During the late 1980s, Sjt. Sonadhar Senapati, who was a well educated Assamese man and was working in a good position at the Assam Secretariat at Shillong, represented the problems of the oppressed castes and tribes of Assam in front of the British. During the meeting he met Mr. Mahi Miri who represented the Mising Tribe in the meeting. Sonadhar Senapati was impressed with the Charming personality of Mr. Mahi Miri. Sonadhar Senapati, breaking all the stereotypes of the society during that time, arranged his daughter's (Indira Senapati's) marriage with Mr. Mahi Miri who later became the Chief Conservator of Kaziranga National Park. Sonadhar Senapati was also the founder of Asom Bania Sabha, a Dalit organization of Assam during the early period of 19th Century.

It was under the leadership of Sonadhar Senapati, that these indigenous communities from the Brahmaputra Valley were inserted in the Schedule Caste category by the Govt. of India. Indira Senapati alias Indira Miri is also one of the famous personalities of the Assamese Bania community. Indira Miri, who did her master's degree at University of Edinburgh, UK during that time, was appointed as the Chief Education Officer of NEFA with her base at Sadiya, a small Assamese town, and worked among the tribals for ten years. During the earthquake of 1950, Miri and her fellow teachers were known to have worked to bring relief to the people of the region. She resigned from NEFA service in 1957 to join the Jorhat BT College as its principal and worked there until her retirement in 1969. She also served the Guwahati University as a member of its executive council, the renowned Indian educationist, awardee of Padmashree award.

People from this community are found in various districts of Brahmaputra Valley, Kamrup, Udalguri, Darrang, Lakhimpur, Nagaon, Majuli, Jorhat, Sivasagar, Dibrugarh etc. Notable persons of the Assamese Bania community of the 20th/ 21st century are Indra Bania (Actor), Kumar Sanjay Krishna (IAS officer) etc.

References

Hindu communities
Baniyas
Banias
Scheduled Castes of Assam
Scheduled Castes of Meghalaya